Emma Roche (born 9 January 1976) is an Australian actress.

Career 
She began modelling at the age of four, and appeared in several adverts. Her first significant acting role was as Danielle in Heartbreak High. After leaving the show, she worked in London, appearing in several plays. She also appeared in a single episode of Wildside in 1997.

She was cast as the character Stephanie Scully on the TV show Neighbours, but was replaced by Carla Bonner before any of her major scenes appeared on TV. Roche later served as Bonner's stunt double in a motorbike scene.

References

External links
 

1976 births
Living people
Australian stage actresses
Australian television actresses